ADD Grup, is a developer and manufacturer of smart metering technology. The company is based in Chișinău, Moldova.

The company's primary product is the ADDAX IMS system for electricity metering, multi-utility metering and streetlight management. The system offers a suite of interconnected hardware and software tools, including electricity meters, communication endpoints, network infrastructure and data management applications. Supported functionalities include ToU metering, load profile, load control, demand response, fraud detection, imbalance control and prepayment.

History
ADD Grup was originally known as ADD, established in 1992.

In 2014, ADD Grup launched the Universal Platform that "allows to change the technology on basis of which smart meters and routers operate" and this was exhibited through a project in Latvia.

As of 2016, the company has supplied over 5 million smart meters worldwide.

In 2017, ADD Grup was chosen by the representatives of the European Council as a successful hi-tech company for a video campaign to promote success stories of companies exporting from Moldova to the European Union.

References 

Companies of Moldova
Meter manufacturers